The Iran Gas Trunkline (IGAT) is a series of large diameter pipelines constructed from gas refineries in the south of Iran (Khuzestan and Bushehr provinces) in order to transfer natural gas to consumption centers across the country.

As of 2008, there are five trunklines in operation, two under construction and two under planning.

History
IGAT1 was completed in October 1970, supplying gas to the Southern Caucasus republics of the Soviet Union.  In 1975 the National Iranian Gas Company concluded agreements with Ruhrgas, Gaz de France, the Soviet Union, and Austria's OMV, to supply gas to Western Europe via a proposed IGAT2.  Under the arrangement, Iran was to supply additional gas to the Soviet Union, while the Soviet Union was to supply gas to Czechoslovakia from its own gas fields in Siberia.  Construction of IGAT2 was halted following the Iranian Revolution.

Main transmission lines

 IGAT1,  in diameter, was constructed between Bid Boland Refinery in Khūzestān Province and Astara in North.
 IGAT2,  in diameter, was constructed between fajr jam Refinery in Bushehr Province and Qazvin in north.
 IGAT3,  in diameter, was constructed between Asalouyeh and Central Province and ultimately to north west of the country.
 IGAT4,  in diameter, transfers natural gas produced in South Pars phases 1 to 5 from Asalouyeh to Fars and Isfahan provinces.
 IGAT5,  in diameter, transfers sour gas produced in phases 6, 7 and 8 to Khūzestān Province to be injected into the oil wells.
 IGAT6,  in diameter, transfers natural gas produced in South Pars phases 6 to 10 from Asalouyeh to Khūzestān Province to be consumed there, in the west of the country, and in Iraq. See also: Iran-Iraq-Syria pipeline
 IGAT7,  in diameter, interconnects east of Asalouyeh to Hormozgān Province and Sar-Khoon Refinery and transfers natural gas produced in South Pars to Hormozgān, Sistan, Baluchestan and Kermān provinces.
 IGAT8,  in diameter, originates in east of Asalouyeh and passes by Parsian Refinery in Fars Province onto Isfahan Province and then to Qom Province.
 IGAT9 (Europe Gas Export Line),  in diameter, originates in east of Asalouyeh and passes by western provinces (Khūzestān, Īlām, Kurdistan and Azerbaijan) and reaches Turkey's border.

See also

NIOC Recent Discoveries
Iran Natural Gas Reserves
South Pars
North Pars
Kish Gas Field
Golshan Gas Field
Ferdowsi Gas Field

References

External links
 The Map of Iran's Natural Gas Network